Sanjiao is a town at the northeast of Zhongshan, Guangdong province, China. It is adjacent to Guangzhou and Panyu on the north.

References

External links
Official site of Sanjiao Town, Zhongshan

Zhongshan